Pheme Perkins (born 1945 in Louisville, Kentucky) is a Professor of Theology at Boston College, where she has been teaching since 1972. She is a nationally recognized expert on the Greco-Roman cultural setting of early Christianity, as well as the Pauline Epistles and Gnosticism.

Perkins was educated at Harvard University (Ph.D., 1971) and St. John's College (A.B., 1966). She has served as the president for the Catholic Biblical Association of America and was an associate editor of The New Oxford Annotated Bible, Third Edition.

Bibliography

Monographs/Commentaries 
 The Gospel of John. (Read & Pray Series). Chicago: Franciscan Herald, 1975.
 Reading the New Testament: An Introduction. New York: Paulist, 1978. Completely rewritten, second edition, 1988.
 The Gospel of John. Chicago: Franciscan Herald, 1978.
 The Johannine Epistles. (New Testament Message Series). Wilmington, Del: Michael Glazier, 1979; 2nd ed, 1984.
 The Gnostic Dialogue: The Early Church and the Crisis of Gnosticism. New York: Paulist, 1980.
 Hearing the Parables of Jesus. Ramsey, NJ: Paulist, 1981.
 Love Commands in the New Testament. Ramsey, NJ: Paulist, 1982.
 Ministering in the Pauline Churches. Ramsey, NJ: Paulist, 1982.
 Revelation. (Collegeville Bible Commentaries) Collegeville: Liturgical Press, 1983.(Translated into Italian).
 With R. Fuller, Who Is This Christ? Philadelphia: Fortress, 1983. (Third printing 1986; Japanese translation, 1991)
 Lent. (Proclamation Series 3). Philadelphia: Fortress, 1984.
 Resurrection: The Early Christian Witness and Contemporary Reflection. Garden City: Doubleday, 1984.
 What We Believe: A Biblical Catechism of the Apostles' Creed. Mahwah: Paulist, 1986.
 "John" and "1,2,3 John", New Jerome Biblical Commentary. eds. R. Brown; J. Fitzmyer, & R. Murphy. Englewood: Prentice Hall, 1990.
 Jesus as Teacher. New York: Cambridge University Press, 1990.
 Epiphany: Cycle A. (Proclamation Series) Minneapolis: Fortress Press, 1992.
 Gnosticism and the New Testament. Minneapolis: Fortress, 1993; (Translated into Korean, 2006).
 Peter. Apostle for the Whole Church. University of South Carolina Press, 1994.(Award from Choice for distinguished academic book.); paperback edition published by Fortress Press, 2000.
 First and Second Peter, James and Jude. Interpretation Commentary Series. Louisville: Westminster/John Knox, 1995. (Translated into Japanese, 1998; translated into Korean, 2005)
 "Gospel of Mark" in The New Interpreter's Bible, ed. L. Keck et al.; Nashville: Abingdon Press, 1995, pp. 509–733.
 Ephesians. Nashville: Abingdon, 1997.
 “The Letter to the Ephesians,” in The New Interpreter’s Bible, ed. L. Keck et al.: Nashville: Abingdon Press, 2000. Vol XI, pp. 251–466.
 Paul in Asia Minor: Colossians, Ephesians and Philemon. Nashville: Abingdon, 2001.
 Abraham’s Divided Children. Galatians and the Politics of Faith. Harrisburg: Trinity Press International, 2001.
 “Commentary on The Pastoral Epistles: 1 and 2 Timothy and Titus,” in J.D.G. Dunn, ed.Eerdmans Commentary on the Bible. Minneapolis: Eerdmans, 2003, pp. 1428–1446.
 Introduction to the Synoptic Gospels. Grand Rapids: Eerdmans, 2007. (Awarded 1st prize in Scripture category by Catholic Publishers Association, Aug. 2008); paperback edition, 2010.
 1 Corinthians. Paideia Commentary Series; Grand Rapids: Baker Academic, 2012.
 Reading the New Testament. 3rd edition revised. Mahwah, NJ: Paulist, 2012.
 1 Peter. Wisdom Commentary series, ed. B. Reid. Collegeville: Liturgical Press, forthcoming.
 Philippians, Philemon and Colossians. Illumination Commentary Series. Grand Rapids: Eerdmans, forthcoming.
 Commentary on the Gospel of Thomas. New Haven: Yale University Press, forthcoming.
 Christians and Their Gospels: Gospels and Christian Communities in the First Three Centuries. Columbia: University of South Carolina Press, forthcoming.

Articles 
 "The Spirit in Our Weakness: Religious Experience in Pauline Theology," New Dimensions in Religious Experience. G. Devine. Staten Island, Alba House, 1971, 123–40.
 "The Soteriology of the Sophia of Jesus Christ," SBL Seminar Papers. SBL, 1971,
 "Apocalyptic Schematization in the Apocalypse of Adam and the Gospel of the Egyptians," SBL Annual Meeting Proceedings, Society of Biblical Literature, 1972, 591–99.
 "Ut Mireris: Origins, Traditions and Ideologies in the Study of Ancient Literary Genres," Working Papers: Task Force on the Genre Gospel, Society of Biblical Literature, 1973, 149–73.
 "Peter in Gnostic Revelation," SBL Seminar Papers vol. 2, Society of Biblical Literature, 1974, 1-13.
 "Metaphor and Community," American Ecclesiastical Review, 169 (1975) 270–81.
 "Irenaeus and the Gnostics," Vigiliae Christianae 30 (1976) 193–200.
 "Interpreting Parables," ed. G. Durka and J.M. Smith, Emerging Issues in Religious Education. New York: Paulist, 1976, 149–72.
 "The Genre and Function of the Apocalypse of Adam," Catholic Biblical Quarterly 39 (1977) 382–95.
 "Peter's Pentecost Sermon: A Limitation on Who May Minister...?" ed. A. Swidler & L. Swidler, Women Priests, New York: Paulist, 1977, 156–58.
 "The Rebellion Myth in Gnostic Apocalypses," SBL Seminar Papers. Society of Biblical Literature, 1978, 15–30.
 "The Missionary Character of the Church in the New Testament," ed. N. Greinbacher & A. Muller, Evangelization in the World Today. (Concilium 114). New York: Seabury, 1979, 1–7.
 "Interpreting Scriptures through the Ages," Catholic Charismatic 4 (1979) 4–8.
 "How Catholics View the Bible," Liguorian, June 1980.
 "Peter, Paul and the Shape of Early Christian Leadership," New Catholic World, 223 (1980) 213–16.
 "On the Origin of the World (CG II,5): A Gnostic Physics," Vigiliae Christianae 34 (1980) 36–46.
 "Pronouncement Stories in the Gospel of Thomas," Semeia 20 (1981) 121–32.
 "Logos Christologies in the Nag Hammadi Codices," Vigiliae Christianae 35 (1981)
 "Deceiving the Deity: Self-Transcendence and the Numinous in Gnosticism," ed. L. Rooner, Transcendence and the Sacred. Notre Dame: Notre Dame, 1981, 138–58.
 "Gnostic Christologies and the New Testament," Catholic Biblical Quarterly 43 (1981) 590–606.
 "Parables and the Vision of Discipleship," New Catholic World 225 (1982) 20–23.
 "Johannine Traditions in the Ap. Jas. (NHC I,2)," Journal of Biblical Literature 101 (1982) 403–14.
 "Nag Hammadi and the New Testament," TSF Bulletin 6 (1982) 6–7.
 "An Ailment of Childhood: Spiritual Pediatrics for Adults," ed. F. Eigo. Dimensions of Spirituality. Villanova: Villanova, 1983, 95-115.
 "Gnosis and the Life of the Spirit: The Price of Pneumatic Order," ed. W. Thompson and J. Kirby, Eric Voeglin: A Theological Appraisal. Toronto: Edwin Mellen, 1983, 222–52.
 "Sophia and the Mother-Father: The Gnostic Goddess," ed. C. Olsen. The Book of the Goddess. Past and Present. New York: Crossroad, 1983, 97-109.
 "James 3:16-4:3," Interpretation 37 (1982) 283–87.
 "Gnosticism," Funk & Wagnalls New Encyclopedia. New York: Funk & Wagnalls, 1983
 "Nag Hammadi and the New Testament," Bible Today (1983)
 "Koinonia in 1 Jn 1:3-7: The Social Context of Division in the Johannine Letters," Catholic Biblical Quarterly 45 (1983) 631–41.
 "Gnosticism as a Christian Heresy" and "Docetism", Encyclopedia of Religion. New York: Macmillan (Free Press)
 "Power in the New Testament," Proceedings of the 37th Annual Convention, CTSA, ed. L. Salem. Catholic Theological Society of America, 1982, 83–89.
 "Paul and Ethics," Interpretation 38 (1984) 268–80.
 "New Testament Ethics: Questions and Contexts," Religious Studies Review 10 (1984) 321–27.
 "Taxes in the New Testament," Journal of Religious Ethics 12 (1984) 182–200.
 "Reconciliation in the New Testament," New Catholic World 227 (1984) 25–27.
 "Women and Discipleship in the New Testament," National Catholic Reporter Apr. 13, 1984, 16–17.
 "The Relationship between the Bible, Oriental Studies and Archaeology from the Perspective of a Biblical Scholar," ed. L Geraty. A Symposium on the Relationship between the Bible, Oriental Studies and Archaeology. Occasional Papers of the Horn Archaeological Museum. No 3. Berrien Springs: Andrews University, 1984, 1-10.
 "Reconciling the Resurrection," Commonweal Apr. 5, 1985, 202–05.
 "Resurrection: The Importance of Believing the Impossible," Washington Post. Arp. 7, 1985. Outlook Section F1,F5.
 Miscellaneous articles, (approx. 123), Harper's Bible Dictionary. San Francisco: Harper & Row, 1985.
 "Biblical Studies: Looking Toward the Future," ed. M. Ward. A Companion to the Bible. Staten Island: Alba House, 1985, 407–19.
 "God in the New Testament: Preliminary Soundings," Theology Today 42 (1985) 332–41.
 "The New Testament -- The Church's Book ??!" Catholic Theological Society of American Proceedings 40/1985, 36–53.
 "Pauline Anthropology in the Light of Nag Hammadi," CBQ 48 (1986) 512–22.
 "Johannine Literature: From Text to Community," The Biblical Heritage in Modern Catholic Scholarship. ed. J.J. Collins & J.D. Crossan; Delaware: Michael Glazier, 1986, 184–210.
 "Christianity and World Religions: New Testament Questions," Interpretation 40 (1986) 367–78.
 "John, the Letters of," The Books of the Bible. ed. B. Anderson. New York: Charles Scribner%27s Sons, 1989
 "1 Thessalonians," Harper's Bible Commentary. ed. J. Mays. San Francisco: Harper & Row, 1988,
 "2 Thessalonians," Harper's Bible Commentary. ed. J. Mays. San Francisco: Harper & Row, 1988,
 "The General Epistles," Harper's Bible Commentary. ed. J. Mays. San Francisco: Harper & Row, 1988,
 "Gnosticism," NJBC (Englewood Cliffs: Prentice Hall, 1990)
 "New Testament Apocrypha: Gospels," NJBC (Englewood Cliffs: Prentice Hall, 1990)
 "Re-visioning the Teaching of Scripture," Current Issues in Catholic Higher Education 7/2 (Winter 1987), 
 "Ordering the Cosmos: Ireneus and the Gnostics," Nag Hammadi, Gnosticism and Early Christianity ed. Charles Hedrick and Robert Hodgson; Peabody: Hendrickson, 1986, 221–38.
 "Marriage in the New Testament and Its World," Commitment to Partnership. Explorations of the Theology of Marriage; ed. W.P. Roberts. Mahwah: Paulist, 1987, 5-30.
 "Women in the Bible and Its World," Interpretation 42 (1988) 33–44.
 "Gnosticism," New Dictionary of Theology, ed. J. Komonchak; Wilmington: Glazier, 1987, 421–23.
 "Gnosticism," Encyclopedia of Early Christianity ed. E. Ferguson, New York: Garland, 1990
 "Jesus: God's Wisdom," Word and World 7 (1987) 273–80. 
 "The Theory of the Will in Classical Antiquity," RSR 13 (Oct. 1987) 318–20.
 "Christology, Friendship and Status: The Rhetoric of Philippians," SBL 1987 Seminar Papers ed. K. Richards; Atlanta: Scholars, 1987, 509–20.
 "The Rejected Jesus and the Kingdom Sayings," Semeia 44 (1988), 79–94.
 "Biblical Traditions and Women's Experience," America 157 (Oct. 31, 1987) 294–96.
 "Theological Implications of New Testament Pluralism," CBQ 50 (1988) 5-23.
 "Sophia as Goddess in the Nag Hammadi Codices," The Feminine in Gnosticism. ed. K. King. Philadelphia: Fortress, 1988,
 "Christology and Mission: Matthew 28:16-20," Listening 24 (1989) 302–09.
 "1 Thessalonians and Hellenistic Religious Practices," To Touch the Text (Festschrift for J. Fitzmyer, edited by P. Kobelski and M. Hogan; New York: Crossroad, 1989) 325–34.
 "Scripture as Source of Renewal," Themes of Renewal. eds. M. Helwig, J. Breslin & J. Holt. Washington: Georgetown University, 1989
 "Scripture in Theology," Faithful Witness. Foundations of Theology for Today's Church (festschrift for A. Dulles. ed. L. O'Donovan & H. Sanks. New York: Crossroad, 1989) 117–31.
 "Confirmation: New Testament Perspectives," Liturgy Training Publications. ed. J. Wilde. Archdiocese of Chicago. 1989.
 "Luke," The Catholic Study Bible: New American Bible. ed. D. Senior. (New York: Oxford, 1990) 417–37.
 "Acts," Catholic Study Bible, 451–69.
 "John," Catholic Study Bible, 437–51.
 "Hope," Advent 1988. National Catholic News Service
 "New Testament Ethics," Anchor Bible Dictionary. ed. D. N. Freedman. Garden City: Doubleday, 1992
 "Crisis in Jerusalem? Narrative Criticism in New Testament Studies," Theological Studies 50 (1989) 296–313.
 "Commentaries: Windows to the Text," Theology Today 47 (1990) 393–98.
 "John's Gospel and Gnostic Christologies: The Nag Hammadi Evidence," Christ and His Communities. Essays in Honor of Reginald H. Fuller (ed. A. Hultgren and B. Hall; Cincinnati: Forward Movement Publications, 1990) 68–76.
 "Beauty, Number and Loss of Order in the Gnostic Cosmos," Neoplatonism and Gnosticism (Studies in Neoplatonism vol. 6; ed. R. Baine Harris; Albany: State University of New York Press, 1991) 281–300.
 "Philippians. Theology for the Heavenly Politeuma," Pauline Theology Vol. I (ed. J. Bassler; Minneapolis: Fortress Press, 1991) 89-104.
 "New Testament Christologies in Gnostic Transformation," The Future of Early Christianity. Essays in Honor of Helmut Koester (ed. B. Pearson; Minneapolis: Fortress, 1991) 433–41. 
 "Gender Analysis: A Response to Antoinette Clark Wire," Social History of the Matthean Community. Cross-Disciplinary Approaches (Minneapolis: Fortress Press, 1991) 122–26.
 Introductions and notes for "1,2,3 John; 1,2 Peter, James, Jude" in New Oxford Annotated Bible (ed. B. Metzger; New York: Oxford, 1991)
 "1 Thessalonians," Women's Bible Commentary (C. Newsome & S. Ringe eds; Louisville: Westminster/John Knox, 1992)
 "Philemon," Women's Bible Commentary
 "Philippians," Women's Bible Commentary
 "The Gnostic Eve," Old Testament Women in Western Literature (eds. J. Frontain & J. Wojcik; Conway, Ak.: CUA Press, 1991) 38–67.
 "`I Have Seen the Lord...' (John 20:18). Women Witnesses to the Resurrection" Interpretation 46 (1992) 31–41.
 "God's Love on the Cross," Living Pulpit 1 (1992)
 "Canon, Paradigms and Progress? Reflections on Essays by Rendtorff, Sugirtharajah and Clines," Biblical Interpretation 1 (1993) 88–95.
 "Commentary on Harold Attridge, Gnostic Platonism," The Proceedings of the Boston Area Colloquium in Ancient Philosophy Vol VII (1991) Ed. John Cleary, Lanham, MD: University Press of America, 1993, 30–35.
 "Christology and the Resurrection," Christology in Dialogue Ed. R.F. Berkey & Sarah A. Edwards; Cleveland: Pilgrim Press, 1993, 173–81.
 "Response to D.A. Carson, New Bible Translations. An Assessment and Prospect," The Bible in the Twenty-First Century. Ed. H.C. Kee; New York: American Bible Society, 1993, 84–88.
 "Review of P.M. Casey, From Jewish Prophet to Gentile God," Biblica 73 (1992) 430–34.
 "Matthew 28:16-20, Resurrection, Ecclesiology and Mission," Society of Biblical Literature 1993 Seminar Papers. Atlanta: Scholars Press, 1993,
 "Apocalyptic and the Love Command," Love Commands in the New Testament. Ed. L. Swartley. Nashville: Westminster/John Knox, 1992
 "The Resurrection of Jesus of Nazareth," in B. Chilton & C.A. Evans eds. Studying the Historical Jesus. Leiden: E.J. Brill, 1994, pp. 423–42.
 "Does the New Testament Have an Economic Message?" in P. Schervish ed. Wealth in Western Thought. Westport: Praeger, 1994, pp. 43–64.
 "Commentary on the Gospel of Thomas," in E. Schussler-Fiorenza ed. Searching the Scriptures 2. A Feminist Commentary. New York: Crossroad, 1994
 "Preaching the Old Testament in the New," Preaching Academy Journal Lutheran Theological Seminary, Philadelphia (1994)
 "Book Roundup: Preaching Luke" Church 10 (1994) 51–54.
 "Gnostcism," Dictionary of Fundamental Theology. New York: Crossroad, 1994
 "Jesus and Ethics," Theology Today 52 (1995) 49–65.
 "Resurrection of Christ," Encyclopedia of Catholicism. Ed. R. McBrien; San Francisco: HarperCollins, 1995, 1108–1110.
 “Spirit and Letter: Poking Holes in the Canon,” Journal of Religion (1996) 307–27.
 Review essay on “Faith and Contexts. Volume Three Further Essays 1952-1990. By Walter J. Ong,” Religion & Literature 28 (1996) 123–27.
 “The Synoptic Gospels and Acts,” Cambridge Companion to Biblical Interpretation. ed. J. Barton. Cambridge: Cambridge University Press, 1998, pp. 241–58.
 “Ephesians: An Introduction,” The Bible Today 36 (1998) 341–47.
 “Hebrews and the Catholic Epistles,” in Mark Powell ed. The New Testament Today. Louisville: Westminster/John Knox, 1998, pp. 121–33.
 “Christ in Jude and 2 Peter,” Who Do You Say that I Am? Essays on Christology in honor of Jack Dean Kingsbury. ed. Mark Allan Powell and David R. Bauer. Louisville: Westminster/John Knox, 1999, 155–65.
 “Identification with the Savior in Coptic Texts from Nag Hammadi,” in Carey C. Newman, James R. Davila and Gladys S. Lewis eds. The Jewish Roots of Christological Monotheism. Papers from the Saint Andrews Conference on the Historical Origins of the Worship of Jesus. Leiden: Brill, 1999, 166–84.
 “If Jerusalem Stood: The Destruction of Jerusalem and Christian Anti-Judaism” Biblical Interpretation 8 (2000) 194-204
 “Mary in the Gospels: A Question of Focus,” Theology Today 56 (1999) 297–306.
 “God, Cosmos and Church Universal. The Theology of Ephesians,” Society of Biblical Literature 2000 Seminar Papers. Atlanta: SBL, 2000, pp. 721ff.
 Study articles on: “Gospels”, “Epistles”, “Canon and Canons: Christian Bibles”, “Interpretation of the Bible: Inner-Biblical: Christian,” “Texts and Versions,” “Cultural Context: Roman Period” in New Oxford Annotated Bible. Third Edition. New York: Oxford University Press, 2001; Fourth edition, 2010.
 “Finding Joy in the Lord,” Quarterly Review 22 (2002) 199–207.
 “New Testament Eschatology and Dominus Iesus” in S. Pope, ed. Sic et Non. Encountering Dominus Iesus, Orbis Press, 2002, pp. 80–88.
 “Introduction and notes to James” in New Interpreter’s Study Bible. Nashville: Abingdon Press, 2003.
 “Patched Garments and Ruined Wine: Whose Folly?” in Mary Ann Beavis ed. The Lost Coin. Parables of Women, Work and Wisdom. Sheffield: Sheffield Academic Press, 124–35.
 “Gnosticism and the Christian Bible,” in Lee M. McDonald and Peter W. Flint eds. The Canon Debate. Peabody, MA: Hendrickson, 2002, pp.. 355–71.
 “Women in the New Testament Church: Real or Memorex” in F. Eigo, ed. Themes in Feminist Theology for the New Millennium (II) Villanova: Villanova University, 2003, pp. 152–87.
 “Being of One Mind... (Phil 2.2)” Apostolic Authority, Persuasion, and Koinonia in New Testament Christianity,”in S. Pope ed. Common Calling. The Laity and the Governance of the Catholic Church. Georgetown University Press, 2004, pp. 25-38.
 “Peter. How a Flawed Disciple became Jesus’ Successor,” Bible Review 20 (Feb. 2004) 12-23.
 “Jesus Encounters Intercessors,” Bible Today (Jan-Feb 2005) 15
 Essays on “Luke,” “Acts” and “John”, Catholic Study Bible. 2nd edition. New York: Oxford University, 2005
 “Christian Books and Sethian Revelations,” in L. Painchaud and P.-H. Poirier, eds., Coptica—Gnostica—Manichaeica. Melanges offerts à W-P Funk. BCNH “Etudes” 7; Quebec: Universite Press Laval, 2006.
 “Gnostic Revelation and Johannine Sectarianism. Reading 1 John from the Perspective of Nag Hammadi,” in ed. G. Van Belle, J.G. van der Watt and P. Maritz. Theology and Christology in the Fourth Gospel. BETL CLXXIV; Louvain: Peeters, 2005, pp. 245–76.
 “A Gnostic Gospel? Title and Genre in the Nag Hammadi Collection,” ARC 33 (2005) 6-22.
 “Adam, Apocalypse of” in New Interpreter’s Dictionary of the Bible. A-C. K. Sackanfeld, ed. Nashville: Abingdon, 2006
 “Coptic, language,” in New Interpreter’s Dictionary of the Bible. A-C. K. Sackanfeld, ed. Nashville: Abingdon, 2006.
 “Resurrection and Christology Are They Related?” Israel’s God and Rebecca’s Children. Essays in Honor of Larry W. Hurtado & Alan F. Segal. Edited by David B. Capes, April D. DeConick, Helen K. Bond and Troy A. Miller; Baylor: Baylor University Press, 2007, 67–75.
 “Gnosticism,” in New Interpreter’s Dictionary of the Bible. D-G. K. Sackanfeld, ed. Nashville: Abingdon, 2007.
 “Resurrection of Jesus,” in Encyclopedia of the Historical Jesus. Craig Evans, ed. New York: Routledge, 2008, 498–505.
 “What Is a Gnostic Gospel?” Catholic Biblical Quarterly 71 (2009) 104–128.
 “To the Jews as a Jew” (1 Cor 9:20): Paul and Jewish Identity,” Studies in Christian-Jewish Relations 4 (2009) 1-10.
 “Schism and Heresy. Identity, cracks, and canyons in early Christianity,” in Routledge Encyclopedia of 2nd and 3rd Century Christianity. Ed. J. Bingham; New York: Routledge, 2010, pp. 227–38.
 “Ephesians, Epistle to the,” The Cambridge Dictionary of Christianity. Ed. D. Patte; Cambridge University Press (2010), 369–70.
 “Jude,” The Cambridge Dictionary of Christianity. Ed. D. Patte; Cambridge University Press (2010), 665.
 “Peter, the Apostle,” The Cambridge Dictionary of Christianity. Ed. D. Patte; Cambridge University Press (2010), 947–48.
 “Ephesians,” translation in The Common English Version (New Testament). Nashville: Abingdon, 2010.
 “The Resurrection of Jesus,” in T. Holman and Porter, eds. Handbook of the Historical Jesus. 4 vols. (Leiden: Brill, 2011) 2409–2432.
 “Christology of Matthew,” Bible Today 49 (2011)
 “Imagining the Kingdom: Jesus Tells Parables,” Bible Today 49 (2011) 223–227.
 “Gender and the Body of Christ: Problems in 1 Corinthians,” Method and Meaning. Essays on New Testament Interpretation in Honor of Harold W. Attridge. Andrew B. McGowan & Kent H. Richards, eds; Atlanta: Society of Biblical Literature, 2011, pp. 487–99. 
 “Adam and Christ in the Pauline Epistles,” in P. Spitaler, ed. Celebrating Paul. Festschrift in Honor of Jerome Murphy-O’Connor and Joseph A. Fitzmyer. CBQMS 48; Washington DC: Catholic Biblical Association, 2012, pp. 128–151.
 "Jewish Christian Gospels: Primitive Tradition Imagined," in J. Schröter, ed. The Apocryphal Gospels within the Context of Early Christian Theology. CBL LX, July 26–28, 2011. Leuven: Peeters, 2012.
 “The Watchers Traditions in the Apocraphon of John. Fallen Angels and the Arrogant Creator in Gnostic Mythology. in A. Harkins et al., eds. The Fallen Angels Tradition. Second Temple Developments and Reception History. CBQMS 53. Washington DC: Catholic Bible Association of America, 2014, pp. 139–156.

References

External links
 Faculty Page at Boston College

American biblical scholars
New Testament scholars
Roman Catholic biblical scholars
Living people
1945 births
People from Louisville, Kentucky
St. John's College (Annapolis/Santa Fe) alumni
Harvard University alumni
Boston College faculty
Female biblical scholars